Erline is a given name. Notable people with the name include:

 Erline Harris (1914–2004), American rhythm and blues singer
 Erline P. McGriff (1924–2004), American professor of nursing
 Erline Nolte (born 1989), German bobsledder

Feminine given names